Christina Gilli-Brügger (born 3 July, 1956) is a Swiss cross-country skier who competed from 1984 to 1988. She finished fourth both in the 4 × 5 km relay and in the 20 km events at the 1988 Winter Olympics in Calgary. At the 1984 Winter Olympics in Sarajevo, she finished sixth in the 4 × 5 km relay.

Gilli-Brügger's best finish at the FIS Nordic World Ski Championships was fifth in the 20 km event at Oberstdorf in 1987. Her best World Cup finish was ninth twice (1986, 1988).

Cross-country skiing results
All results are sourced from the International Ski Federation (FIS).

Olympic Games

World Championships

World Cup

Season standings

References

External links

Women's 4 x 5 km cross-country relay Olympic results: 1976-2002 

1956 births
Cross-country skiers at the 1984 Winter Olympics
Cross-country skiers at the 1988 Winter Olympics
Living people
Swiss female cross-country skiers
20th-century Swiss women